James or Jim Tully may refer to:

James Tully (Irish politician) (1915–1992), Irish trade unionist, politician and Deputy Leader of the Irish Labour Party
James Tully (Australian politician) (1877–1962), member of the Australian House of Representatives
Jim Tully (1886–1947), vagabond, pugilist, and American writer
Jim Tully (footballer) (1883–1949), English footballer for Clapton Orient and Rochdale
James Tully (philosopher) (born 1946), Canadian philosopher and teacher 
James William Lee Tully, Social Credit candidate in the 1953 Manitoba provincial election

See also
Tully (disambiguation)